Dubai British School is an international school offering a British education to students aged three to eighteen, located in The Springs, Emirates Hills, Dubai. The school is managed by Taaleem, one of largest education providers in Middle East.

The school was established in 2005, and is open to students from Foundation 1 to Year 13.

Curriculum 
The school offers the National Curriculum for England, following the Early Years Foundation Stage curriculum, enhanced by WOW Learning in Primary and a wide variety of GCSE, BTEC and A-Level courses from Year 10 to Year 13.

Student achievement 
The school consistently surpasses national averages in the UK for A-Level and GCSE exam results. The A-Level and BTEC students go on to attend top universities worldwide, including University of Cambridge, Johns Hopkins University, King's College London and University of Tokyo.

Rating and accreditation 
DBS' performance is rated Outstanding by the KHDA's Dubai School Inspection Bureau (DSIB) and by British School Overseas (BSO). The school is also fully accredited by the Council of International Schools (CIS).

Facilities

Extra-curricular activities
Beyond the taught curriculum, students are strongly encouraged to participate in the wide range of activities offered. These ECAs are a vital part of the learning experiences and most of the ECA programme is run by staff and is free-of-charge. Outside agencies are used for some specialist activities. The school ECAs provided includes football, swimming, cricket, rugby, arts and Crafts, yoga, karate, tennis, basketball, choir, drama, games, Duke of Edinburgh and F1.

The Duke of Edinburgh Award
The Duke of Edinburgh's Award (The International Award for Young People) is designed to expand the horizons of those who participate in it. The majority of eligible year groups take part, helping students understand the importance of community, teamwork and perseverance. In past years, the expeditions have included desert walks, mountain climbing and trips to Vietnam, Thailand and Mauritius.

References

External links
 Official website
 Taaleem on the Dubai British School
DSIB Report 2017-2018
 Good Schools Guide

British international schools in Dubai
International schools in Dubai
Private schools in the United Arab Emirates